Mount Kalatungan, also known as Catatungan, is a volcanic mountain located in the province of Bukidnon in the southern Philippines. It is a stratovolcano with no known historical eruptions and classified by the Philippine Institute of Volcanology and Seismology (PHIVOLCS) as a potentially active volcano.

It is the fifth highest mountain in the country with an elevation of  asl. It is one of the several high elevation peaks in the Kalatungan Mountain Range in Bukidnon on the island of Mindanao, the second largest island in the Philippines.

See also
 Mount Kitanglad
 List of mountains in the Philippines
 List of Southeast Asian mountains
 List of active volcanoes in the Philippines
 List of potentially active volcanoes in the Philippines
 List of inactive volcanoes in the Philippines

References

External links
 
     Mount Kalatungan - Mounta Wiji Traverse

Mountains of the Philippines
Stratovolcanoes of the Philippines
Volcanoes of Mindanao
Landforms of Bukidnon
Potentially active volcanoes of the Philippines